Kenya competed at the 1988 Summer Paralympics in Seoul, South Korea.

Team 
Kenya made their fourth Paralympic Games appearance in Seoul, South Korea.   They field a team of twelve sportspeople, including eight men and four women.

Medalists 
12 competitors from Kenya won 5 medals including 4 silver and 1 bronze and finished 41st in the medal table.

See also 
 Kenya at the Paralympics
 Kenya at the 1988 Summer Olympics

References 

Nations at the 1988 Summer Paralympics
1988
Summer Paralympics